The Chillout Project: Acid Jazz is the sixth volume of Anton Ramos' The Chillout Project series.

Track listing
 Think Twice - More Than Your Lover
 Izit - Say Yeah (Acoustic Mix)
 Kayo - Om Natten
 Ame Stronge - La Belle Humaine
 Lisa Nilsson - Never, Never, Never Again
 Liane Foly - Voler La Nuit
 Teri Moise - Star
 Vanessa Simon - Soothe Me To My Soul (Original Mix)
 Stanley Clarke - Fantasy Love
 Richard Darbyshire - True Survivor
 Level 42 - Love In A Peaceful World
 Snowboy - Girl Overboard
 Sydney Youngblood - Anything (Classic Frankie Mix)
 Alan Sorrenti - Figli Delle Stelle (Fabulous Remix)
 yo mama fool - Figly digly doo

2005 compilation albums
The Chillout Project albums
Acid jazz compilation albums